Ji-won, also spelled Jee-won or Chi-won, 
is a Korean unisex given name. The meaning differs based on the hanja used to write each syllable of the name. There are 61 hanja with the reading "ji" and 46 hanja with the reading "won" on the South Korean government's official list of hanja which may be registered for use in given names.

People with this name include:

Entertainers
Do Ji-won (born 1968), South Korean actress
Ye Ji-won (born 1973), South Korean actress
Uhm Ji-won (born 1977), South Korean actress
Eun Ji-won (born 1978), South Korean male rapper
Ha Ji-won (born Jeon Hae-rim, 1978), South Korean actress
Jang Ji-won (born 1979), South Korean female taekwondo practitioner
Wang Ji-won (born 1988), South Korean actress and ballet dancer
Kim Ji-won (actress) (born 1992), South Korean actress
Bobby (rapper) (born Kim Ji-won, 1995), South Korean rapper, member of boy group iKON

Sportspeople
Kim Ji-won (boxer) (born 1959), South Korean male boxer
Woo Ji-won (born 1973), South Korean male basketball player
Jang Ji-won (born 1979), South Korean female taekwondo practitioner
Han Ji-won (born 1994), South Korean male football midfielder (K-League Classic)
Seo Jee-won (born 1994), South Korean female freestyle skier
Kim Ji-won (badminton) (born 1995), South Korean female badminton player

Others
Bak Jiwon (born 1737), Joseon Dynasty male philosopher
Park Ji-weon (born 1934), South Korean male politician, member of the 13th National Assembly (1988–1992)
Park Jie-won (born 1942), South Korean male politician, Minister of Ministry of Culture, Sports and Tourism under Kim Dae-jung
Kim Chi-won (1943–2013), South Korean female writer
Yang Ji-won (academic) (born 1949), South Korean male chemistry professor
Vittoria Yeo (Korean name Yeo Ji-won, born 1980), South Korean operatic soprano

See also
List of Korean given names

References

Korean unisex given names